Biaggio Chianese (born October 28, 1961 in giugliano (naples)) is a retired boxer from Italy, who won the bronze medal at both the 1986 World Amateur Boxing Championships and the 1987 European Amateur Boxing Championships in the men's heavyweight (+ 91 kg) division.

References
 

1961 births
Living people
Sportspeople from Trieste
Heavyweight boxers
Italian male boxers
AIBA World Boxing Championships medalists